David William Parry is a British author. He has written two collections of poetry, Caliban's Redemption (2004) and The Grammar of Witchcraft (2009), as well as a collection of essays, Mount Athos Inside Me: Essays on Religion, Swedenborg and Arts (2019).

Career

Writing 
Parry has written three books. His first book, Caliban's Redemption (2004), is a collection of occult poems.  Next, Parry published The Grammar of Witchcraft (2009).  Parry's third book, Mount Athos Inside Me: Essays on Religion, Swedenborg and Arts (Manticore Press 2019), is a collection of essays.  Parry spoke at TEDxLambeth alongside Haralampi G. Oroschakoff. Their talk was entitled "a chat on conceptual arts".

Podcast 
Parry co-founded a weekly podcast show called THA Talks with Paul Obertelli in 2014 to create a platform that encouraged "Free Thoughts and Open Minds".

Central Asia 
In 2013, Parry was interviewed by The Guardian about the UK Border Agency's treatment of a Russian-born poet, Alex Galper (who had studied under Allen Ginsberg). Parry was chairman of the Eurasian Creative Guild (ECG) as of 2016.

Works 

 Caliban's Redemption (2004)
 The Grammar of Witchcraft (2009)
 Mount Athos Inside Me: Essays on Religion, Swedenborg and Arts (2019)

References 

Living people
Year of birth missing (living people)